Joseph Connor Rhys Heyes (born 13 April 1999) is an English professional rugby union player for Leicester Tigers in Premiership Rugby.  His usual position is prop.  He was a Premiership Rugby champion in 2022.

Club career
Heyes began playing rugby at age 14, originally a football goalkeeper for Nottingham Forest he initially played outside centre for Nottingham Moderns RFC and then moved to Newark before joining Leicester Tigers academy at 16 and switching position to prop.
Heyes was loaned to Loughborough Students RUFC in the 2017/18 National One season and featured in 17 games. 

Heyes made his debut for Leicester Tigers on 16 September 2018 against Wasps at the Ricoh Arena in a 35–41 defeat in round three of the 2018–19 Premiership Rugby season. After a seven-minute cameo in Leicester's 23–15 win against Northampton Saints at Twickenham Heyes was named in RUGBYPASS's team of the week.

On 21 June 2019 Heyes signed a new contract with Leicester. In May 2021 Heyes was a second-half substitute as Leicester were defeated by Montpellier in the final of the European Rugby Challenge Cup. Heyes made his 100th Leicester Tigers appearance on 11 June 2022 against Northampton Saints in the Gallagher Premiership Semi-Final, the 2nd youngest prop in club history to do so. Heyes played as a replacement in the 2022 Premiership Rugby final as Tigers beat Saracens 15-12.

International career
He was named in the England under 20s squad for the 2018 World Rugby Under 20 Championship and scored in the final as England finished runners up to hosts France. The following year saw Heyes score a try against Wales to secure a fifth-place finish at the 2019 World Rugby Under 20 Championship.

In October 2020 Heyes was called up to a senior England training squad by head coach Eddie Jones and in January 2021 he was called into the shadow squad of the England Senior Test team for the 2021 Six Nations.

Personal life
Heyes is the son of former professional footballer Darren Heyes, his grandfathers are George Heyes, a former professional footballer for Leicester City and Swansea City, and Bob Rees, a former British record holder in long jump. Heyes was a regular team mascot during his father's time as Goalkeeping Coach at Notts County.

References

External links
 

1999 births
Living people
English rugby union players
Leicester Tigers players
England international rugby union players
Rugby union props
Rugby union players from Nottingham